This is a list of recipients of the Governor General's Award for French-language drama. The award was created in 1981 when the Governor General's Award for French language poetry or drama was divided.

Because the award is presented for plays published in print, a play's eligibility for the award can sometimes be several years later than its initial theatrical staging. Titles which compile several works by the playwright into a single volume may also be nominated for or win the award.

Winners and nominees

1980s

1990s

2000s

2010s

2020s

References

French
Awards established in 1981
1981 establishments in Canada
Drama French
Canadian dramatist and playwright awards

French-language literary awards